Macaduma cretacea is a moth in the subfamily Arctiinae first described by George Hampson in 1914. It is found in Taiwan.

The wingspan is 12–13 mm.

References

Moths described in 1914
Macaduma